Thomas Ellis (c. 1774–1832) was a Tory UK Member of Parliament representing Dublin City in 1820–1826.

In a by-election on 30 June 1820 Ellis replaced the deceased former Whig MP the Right Honourable Henry Grattan. The Whig candidate defeated in the by-election was the great orators son also called Henry Grattan. Ellis retained the seat until he retired, at the dissolution of Parliament, in 1826.

References
Parliamentary Election Results in Ireland, 1801-1922, edited by B.M. Walker (Royal Irish Academy 1978)
The Parliaments of England by Henry Stooks Smith (1st edition published in three volumes 1844–50), 2nd edition edited (in one volume) by F.W.S. Craig (Political Reference Publications 1973)

1774 births
1832 deaths
Members of the Parliament of the United Kingdom for County Dublin constituencies (1801–1922)
UK MPs 1820–1826
Tory MPs (pre-1834)